Center Township, Ohio, may refer to:

Center Township, Carroll County, Ohio
Center Township, Columbiana County, Ohio
Center Township, Guernsey County, Ohio
Center Township, Mercer County, Ohio
Center Township, Monroe County, Ohio
Center Township, Morgan County, Ohio
Center Township, Noble County, Ohio
Center Township, Williams County, Ohio
Center Township, Wood County, Ohio

Ohio township disambiguation pages